The Pakistan Catholic Bishops' Conference (PCBC) is the episcopal conference of the Catholic bishops of Pakistan. Its objectives are to facilitate coordinated study and discussion of issues affecting the Church, and adoption of a common policy and effective action in all matters concerning the Church in Pakistan.

The Pakistan Catholic Bishops' Conference decided on 18 April 1990 to build this new seminary for philosophical studies in the Roman Catholic Archdiocese of Lahore. Prior to this the Christ the King Seminary in Karachi was the only major seminary in the country.

In 1997 the PCBC approved a National Catholic Institute of Theology to be set up in Karachi to provide theological formation in the spirit of renewal desired by the Second Vatican Council.

Presidents
Cardinal Joseph Cordeiro, 1958–1971 and 1973-1994

Archbishop Theotonius Amal Ganguly, C.S.C., 1971–1973

Archbishop Armando Trindade, 1994–2000

Archbishop Simeon Anthony Pereira, 2000–2002

Archbishop Lawrence Saldanha, 2002-2011 

Archbishop Joseph Arshad, 2011-present

Secretary General
Bishop Anthony Theodore Lobo, 1989–2010

Bishop Rufin Anthony, 2010-2015

Commissions
National Commission for Justice and Peace

National Catholic Education Commission, Pakistan 

Major Seminary

Muslim Christian Dialogue

Catechetics and Biblical Apostolate

Liaison with Charismatics

Ongoing Formation of Clergy

Revision of Urdu Catholic Bibles

References

Catholic Church in Pakistan
Episcopal conferences